Jaroslav Kožešník (8 June 1907 in Kněžice – 26 June 1985 in Prague) was a Czech and Czechoslovak scientist, mathematician, an expert in mechanics and automation (cybernetics), chairman of the Czechoslovak Academy of Sciences (1969–1970, 1970–1977, 1977–1980), a Communist Party functionary in Communist Czechoslovakia and a member of the parliament during the Normalization period, recipient of several state awards, editor-in-chief of the Kybernetika journal.

Books
1983: Teorie podobnosti a modelování
1979: Kmitání mechanických soustav
1965: Základy teorie přístrojů (Principles of the Theory of Machines)
1960: Dynamika strojů (Dynamics of Machines), translated into English, German, Russian, Polish
1960: Mechanika elektrických strojů točivých (The Mechanics of Electrical Rotating Machines), translated into several languages
1947: Fysikální podobnost a stavba modelů

Awards
Honorary title of the Hero of Socialist Labor of Czechoslovak Socialist Republic, the Order of the Republic, the Order of the Victorious February, Order of Labour, A. Zápotockého medal with ribbon, the Soviet Order of the Red Banner of Labour, Order of Friendship of Peoples (awarded by the Presidium of the Supreme Soviet of the Soviet Union), Star friendship Nations in gold (awarded by the State Council of the GDR). For scientific merit is twice laureate of the Klement Gottwald State Prize, received the highest scientific honors the Academy of Sciences of the Soviet Union, Lomonosov Gold Medal, two honorary gold plaques of the SCAS "For Merits of science and humanity" and a plaque of Zdeněk Nejedlý.

References

1907 births
1985 deaths
20th-century Czech mathematicians
People from Jihlava District
Communist Party of Czechoslovakia politicians
Czech Technical University in Prague alumni
Foreign Members of the USSR Academy of Sciences
Members of the Central Committee of the Communist Party of Czechoslovakia
Recipients of the Lomonosov Gold Medal
Recipients of the Order of Friendship of Peoples
Recipients of the Order of the Red Banner of Labour
Czech mathematicians
Czechoslovak mathematicians